Hum Tum is a 2004 Indian Hindi-language romantic comedy film written and directed by Kunal Kohli. Produced by Aditya Chopra under Yash Raj Films, the film stars Saif Ali Khan and Rani Mukherji. Hum Tum follows the encounters of two people who run into each other on several occasions under circumstances ranging from friendly to hostile to cordial to loving. Over many years and countless run-ins, the two despise each other, befriend each other, and fall in love with each other – in no particular order. The film has several short animation sequences, which were created by Kathaa Animations headed by Prakash Nambiar. The special effects were done by Tata Elxsi.

It was the sixth highest-grossing film of that year. It received mixed-to-positive reviews from critics, with praise for its direction, soundtrack and cast performances, but criticism for its script. At the 50th Filmfare Awards, Hum Tum received 8 nominations, and won 5 awards, including Best Director (Kohli), Best Actress (Mukherji), Best Comedian (Khan), Best Female Playback Singer (Alka Yagnik for "Hum Tum"), and Best Scene of the Year. At the 52nd National Film Awards in 2005, Khan was awarded the National Film Award for Best Actor.

Plot
Karan Kapoor (Saif Ali Khan) is a cartoonist and a self-styled ladies' man. His daily comic, named "Hum Tum," explores the battle of male/female behavior. On a plane from Delhi to New York, he meets Rhea Prakash (Rani Mukerji) who doesn't seem to be interested in him. His feeble attempts at flirting go nowhere, but when they have a stopover in Amsterdam, she agrees to explore the city with him. Karan quickly learns he has little in common with the feisty but proper Rhea, but he won't give up. He ends their contentious time together with an unwelcome kiss. Outraged, Rhea slaps him, and storms off, but Karan insists they'll meet again. After six months, he spots her in a park in New York, and he makes a scene with his girlfriend Shalini (Shenaz Treasurywala), who turns out to be Rhea's childhood friend, which ends in their break-up.
 
Three years later, Karan is helping his mother plan a wedding that turns out to be Rhea's. Rhea is marrying Sameer (Abhishek Bachchan). They bicker again, but this time, they part on good terms. Three years later in Paris, Karan is visiting his father Arjun (Rishi Kapoor), when he runs into Rhea. He learns from Rhea's mother Parminder "Bobby" Prakash (Kirron Kher) that Sameer has died in a car accident just after their first marriage anniversary, and he sets out to help her reclaim her positive outlook on life.

Karan returns to Mumbai, and three months later, Rhea and Bobby visit. Sensing that she needs to be with a strait-laced, "boring guy," he conspires with Bobby to fix her up with his shy best friend, Mihir Vora (Jimmy Sheirgill). But eventually Mihir falls in love with a friend of Karan's, Diana Fernandez (Isha Koppikar) and they get engaged. On the engagement night, Rhea learns from drunk Diana about the conspiracy and gets upset with Karan. Mihir makes Rhea realize hers and Karan's love for each other. That night Rhea and Karan consummate their relationship. Karan deems it a mistake and asks Rhea to marry him as he feels he took advantage of her, and that marriage will rectify the mistake. Rhea becomes upset, as she did not consider their actions a mistake; she realizes she loves him but tells Karan that they should not commit one more mistake by marrying for the wrong reasons. Rhea leaves him since Karan projects his confused feelings as guilt rather than love for her. Karan realises his mistake and tries to seek her out but fails.

One year later Karan's cartoon Hum Tum becomes a hit and he writes a book about Hum and Tum. Basically, the story is based on his love story with Rhea, who reads that book and finds him in the press conference. Karan and Rhea reunite again. Karan admits his love for her, and they get married and have a baby girl.

Cast
 Saif Ali Khan as Karan Kapoor
 Rani Mukherji as Rhea Prakash
 Rishi Kapoor as Arjun Kapoor, Karan's father
 Kirron Kher as Parminder "Bobby" Prakash, Rhea's mother
 Rati Agnihotri as Anjali "Anju" Kapoor, Karan's mother
Jimmy Sheirgill as Mihir Vora, Karan's friend
 Isha Koppikar in a cameo appearance as Diana Fernandez, Mihir's love interest
 Abhishek Bachchan in a special appearance as Sameer Khanna
 Shenaz Treasurywala in a special appearance as Shalini Gupta
 Parinita Seth as Pooja Gupta
 Parzaan Dastur as the voice of Hum
 Gayatri S. Iyer as the voice of Tum

Production 
Aamir Khan was first approached for the role of Karan. However, he declined the offer. Hrithik Roshan and Vivek Oberoi also turned down the part, thereby prompting Kunal Kohli and Aditya Chopra to rope in Saif Ali Khan.

Reception
Taran Adarsh of Bollywood Hungama says that "casting is one of the film's strengths," arguing that "it would be hard to imagine anyone other than Khan as the wisecracking Karan... he makes Karan insufferable and likable at the same time... His arresting performance is sure to skyrocket his fan-following amongst the youngsters." Adarsh also argues that "Mukherji's effervescent personality infuses Rhea with buoyancy, and, later in the film, she too shows a vulnerable side. Mukherji takes a giant leap as an actor... her performance is flawless."

Awards
56th National Film Awards:
 Won, Best Actor – Saif Ali Khan
50th Filmfare Awards:
 Won, Best Director – Kunal Kohli
 Won, Best Actress – Rani Mukherji
 Won, Best Female Playback Singer – Alka Yagnik for "Hum Tum"
 Won, Best Comedian – Saif Ali Khan
 Won, Best Scene of the Year
 Nominated, Best Film
 Nominated, Best Actor – Saif Ali Khan
 Nominated, Best Music Director – Jatin–Lalit
6th IIFA Awards:
 Won, Best Actress in a Leading Role – Rani Mukherji
 Nominated, Best Film
 Nominated, Best Director – Kunal Kohli
 Nominated, Best Actor in a Leading Role – Saif Ali Khan
 Nominated, Best Female Playback Singer – Alka Yagnik for "Hum Tum"
2005 Screen Awards:
 Won, Best Director – Kunal Kohli
 Won, Best Actress – Rani Mukherji
 Won, Best Lyricist – Prasoon Joshi for "Hum Tum"
 Won, Best Special Effects – Kathaa Animations and Prakash Nambiar
 Nominated, Best Film
 Nominated, Best Actor – Saif Ali Khan
 Nominated, Best Supporting Actress – Kirron Kher
 Nominated, Best Music Director – Jatin–Lalit
Nominated, Best Screenplay – Kunal Kohli and Siddharth Raj Anand
 Nominated, Best Dialogue – Kunal Kohli
2005 Zee Cine Awards:
 Won, Best Actress – Rani Mukherji
 Won, Best Song Recording – Pramod Chandorkar (Studio One) and Vijay Dayal (Studio One)
 Nominated, Best Film
 Nominated, Best Director – Kunal Kohli
 Nominated, Best Supporting Actor – Rishi Kapoor
 Nominated, Best Music Director – Jatin–Lalit
 Nominated, Best Lyricist – Prasoon Joshi For "Hum Tum"
 Nominated, Best Comedian – Kirron Kher
 Nominated, Best Comedian – Saif Ali Khan
Nominated, Best Screenplay – Kunal Kohli and Siddharth Raj Anand
Nominated, Best Production Design – Sharmishta Roy
 Nominated, Best Editing – Ritesh Soni

Soundtrack
Nearly all of the songs in the film were composed by Jatin–Lalit and have lyrics written by Prasoon Joshi, with the exception of "U'n'I (Mere Dil Vich Hum Tum)", which was composed by British-Indian producer Rishi Rich. The following are the songs of the film:

The CD and audio cassette also feature an instrumental version of "Hum Tum" and a deleted song called "Yaara Yaara". This tune was reused in Kunal Kohli's next film, Fanaa (2006), in the songs "Chand Sifarish" and, more noticeably, "Chanda Chamke". The latter has the same tune throughout the entire song. Both the songs are inspired from the song "Samra we betha" by the Iraqi band Miami. The song "Chak De" is inspired from the Arabic song "Yalla Ya Shabab" by Ragheb Alama. According to the Indian trade website Box Office India, with around 1,600,000 units sold, this film's soundtrack album was the year's eighth highest-selling.

Graphic novel
 A graphic novel named Hum Tum: The War Begins! was published by Yomics World in 2012.
 Another graphic novel named Ek Tha Tiger: Caught in the Web was published in 2012 by Yomics World, which also features some Hum Tum characters.

Notes

External links

 

2004 films
2000s Hindi-language films
2004 romantic comedy films
Indian romantic musical films
Films featuring a Best Actor National Award-winning performance
Films scored by Jatin–Lalit
Yash Raj Films films
Indian films with live action and animation
Indian remakes of American films
Hindi films remade in other languages
Films directed by Kunal Kohli
Films adapted into comics